Wilhelm Baum may refer to:

 Wilhelm Baum (historian) (born 1948), Austrian historian
 Wilhelm Baum (surgeon) (1799–1883), German surgeon